Armand de Bourbon, Prince of Conti (11 October 162926 February 1666), was a French nobleman, the younger son of Henri II, Prince of Condé and Charlotte Marguerite de Montmorency, daughter of Henri I, Duke of Montmorency. He was the brother of le Grand Condé and Anne Geneviève, Duchess of Longueville. As a member of the reigning House of Bourbon, he was a Prince du Sang.

Early life 

The title of Prince of Conti was revived in his favor at the time of his birth in 1629. With the title Armand also inherited the Château de L'Isle-Adam and its estate, which had been passed down to his mother Charlotte Marguerite after the death of her brother, Henri II de Montmorency. He was destined for a clerical career and studied theology at the university of Bourges, but although he received several benefices, including the abbeys of Cluny and Saint Denis, he did not take orders. He played a conspicuous part in the intrigues and fighting of the Fronde, became in 1648 commander-in-chief of the rebel army, and in 1650 was with his brother (Condé) and brother-in-law (Longueville) imprisoned at Vincennes.

Life in prison 
Said to be "mystic" and "full of strange ideas", Conti turned slightly mad while in prison. Having a secret passion for his sister the Duchess of Longueville, he invented tricks to make her notice him. He tried alchemy and potions for some time and eventually bruised himself with a spatula. This episode was ultimately fortunate for him because he could no longer be refused external help from physicians, some of whom would pass letters and pleas to the outside world which speeded up his eventual release.

Later life 
Released when Cardinal Mazarin went into exile, he wished to marry Charlotte-Marie de Lorraine (1627–1652), the second daughter of Madame de Chevreuse, the confidante of the queen, Anne of Austria (wife of King Louis XIII of France), but was prevented from doing so by his brother Condé, who was now supreme in the state. He was concerned in the Fronde of 1651, but soon afterwards became reconciled with Cardinal Mazarin, and in 1654, married the cardinal's niece, Anne Marie Martinozzi, as well as secured the government of Guienne. They had two sons, Louis Armand and François Louis.

He took command of the army, which in 1654, invaded Spain through Catalonia, where he captured three towns from the Spanish. He afterwards led the French forces in Italy, but after his defeat before Alessandria in 1657, he retired to Languedoc, where he devoted himself to study and mysticism until his death.

At Clermont, Conti had been a fellow student of Molière's, from whom he secured an introduction to the court of King Louis XIV, but afterwards, when writing a treatise against the stage entitled, Traité de la comédie et des spectacles selon les traditions de l'Église (Paris, 1667), he charged the dramatist with keeping a school of atheism. Conti also wrote Lettres sur la grâce, and Du devoir des grands et des devoirs des gouverneurs de province.

Conti died on 26 February 1666 at Pézenas in Languedoc, France.

Issue
Armand married Anne Marie Martinozzi, the daughter of Girolamo Martinozzi and Laura Margherita Mazzarini, elder sister of Cardinal Mazarin. They had the following children:
Louis de Bourbon (1658), died in infancy.
Louis Armand I, Prince of Conti (1661–1685), married Marie Anne de Bourbon, the eldest legitimised daughter of King Louis XIV and his mistress, Louise de La Vallière, and died childless.
 François Louis, Prince of Conti (1664–1709), known as "le Grand Conti", married Marie Thérèse de Bourbon, daughter of Henri Jules, Prince of Condé (Armand's nephew), and had issue.

Ancestry

References

Conti, Armand de Bourbon, prince de
Conti, Armand de Bourbon, prince de
17th-century French military personnel
17th-century French writers
17th-century male writers
Grand Masters of France
Armand
Jansenists
Nobility from Paris
Armand de Bourbon, prince de
French male writers
17th-century peers of France
People of the Fronde
Royal reburials